The 2010 Sun Belt Conference football season was the 10th season of college football play for the Sun Belt Conference. The season began September 2, 2010 and concluded January 6, 2011 as part of the 2010-11 NCAA Division I FBS football season. The Sun Belt Conference consists of 9 football members:  Arkansas State, Florida Atlantic, Florida International, Louisiana-Lafayette, Louisiana-Monroe, Middle Tennessee, North Texas, Troy, and Western Kentucky.

Previous season 
Troy (9-4) was the Sun Belt champions and lost to Central Michigan in the GMAC Bowl 44-41 in overtime.  Although Troy was the conference champion, the team decided to accept an invitation to play in the GMAC Bowl, giving another Sun Belt team the privilege of playing in the R+L Carriers New Orleans Bowl.  That team was Middle Tennessee (10-3), who became the Sun Belt's first ever 10 win team since the league began playing FBS football in 2001.  The 10-3 record earned Middle Tennessee a trip to the R+L Carriers New Orleans Bowl where they faced Southern Miss and won 42-32.

One other Sun Belt team, Louisiana-Monroe, was bowl eligible with record of 6-6 but was not invited to a bowl game.

Preseason

Sun Belt Coaches Poll 
The 2010 Sun Belt coaches preseason poll was announced during a two-day media web-based event on July 19 and 20. Middle Tennessee was selected as the favorite to win the conference.

First Place Votes in Parenthesis
 Middle Tennessee – 75 (5)
 Troy – 73 (3)
 Arkansas State – 53
 Louisiana-Lafayette – 49 (1)
 Florida Atlantic - 45
 Florida International – 42
 Louisiana-Monroe – 32
 North Texas – 27
 Western Kentucky - 9

Pre-Season All-Sun Belt Team 

Offense
Dwight Dasher (MT, Sr., QB)
Alfred Morris (FAU, Jr., RB)
Lance Dunbar (NT, Jr., RB)
T. Y. Hilton (FIU, Jr., WR)
Jerrel Jernigan (Troy, Sr., WR)
Ladarius Green (ULL, Jr., TE)
Derek Newton (ASU, Sr., OL)
Brad Serirni (FIU, Sr., OL)
Mark Fisher (MT, Sr., OL)
Esteban Santiago (NT, Sr., OL)
Tyler Clark (Troy, Sr., OL)

Defense
Bryan Hall (ASU, Sr., DL)
Troy Evans (ULM, Jr., DL)
Jamari Lattimore (MT, Sr., DL)
Brandon Akpunku (NT, Jr., DL)
Demario Davis (ASU, Jr., LB)
Grant Fleming (ULL, Sr., LB)
Craig Robertson (NT, Sr., LB)
Tavious Polo (FAU, Sr., DB)
Anthony Gaitor (FIU, Sr., DB)
Jeremy Kellem (MT, Sr., DB)
Bryan Willis (Troy, So., DB)

Special teams
Alan Gendreau (MT, Jr., Place Kicker)
Spencer Ortego (ULL, Sr., Punter)
T. Y. Hilton (FIU, Jr., Return Specialist)

Offensive Player of the Year
Dwight Dasher (MT, Sr., QB)

Defensive Player of the Year
Bryan Hall (ASU, Sr., DL)

Postseason
All three bowl-eligible Sun Belt teams were invited to participate in bowl games.  These teams compiled a 2-1 record in postseason play.

References

2010 Sun Belt Conference football season